Phil Martin (born October 27, 1964) is a former professional strongman and highland games competitor who is best known for competing in the finals of the 1995 World's Strongest Man contest in Nassau, Bahamas. Nicknamed "Stonehenge," Phil Martin also competed professionally in The Highland Games and works in construction.

References 

American strength athletes
Living people
1964 births